Road Runner Express is a steel roller coaster located at Six Flags Fiesta Texas in San Antonio, Texas. It was built for the park's 1997 season and is the last mine train roller coaster ever to be built by Arrow Dynamics in a Six Flags theme park.

In contrast to most of the similarly named Road Runner Express coasters at Six Flags parks, Fiesta Texas' version is not a junior coaster, but a full-scale, though not extreme, family roller coaster. The target audience for the ride is families.

Some track portions of Road Runner Express pass under segments of the Iron Rattler roller coaster, as they sit next to each other in the park's Crackaxle Canyon.

References

External links 
Official Road Runner Express Web Site

Roller coasters introduced in 1997
Roller coasters operated by Six Flags
Six Flags Fiesta Texas
Roller coasters in Texas
Wile E. Coyote and the Road Runner